PFV may refer to:

PFV (Rapper)
Primum Familiae Vini
Perfective aspect
Persistent Fetal Vasculature, a congenital eye anomaly
Powerhouse fruits and vegetables, roughly speaking a synonym for the so-called 'superfoods'.
Protein film voltammetry